Cornelius Joseph Brady (March 4, 1897 – June 19, 1947) was a  Major League Baseball pitcher. In 24 career games, he had a 2–3 record, with a 4.20 ERA. He batted and threw right-handed.

Brady graduated from St. Xavier High School across the river in Cincinnati.

References

External links

1897 births
1947 deaths
Cincinnati Reds players
New York Yankees players
Major League Baseball pitchers
Baseball players from Kentucky
Sportspeople from Covington, Kentucky
St. Xavier High School (Ohio) alumni
Dallas Giants players
Toronto Maple Leafs (International League) players
Toledo Iron Men players
Toledo Mud Hens players
Minneapolis Millers (baseball) players
Milwaukee Brewers (minor league) players
Atlanta Crackers players
Birmingham Barons players
Newark Bears (IL) players